The term Nobleman's Republic can refer to:
 History of Poland (1569–1795)
 Golden Liberty, the political system of that time in Poland